Sandy Wayne Robson (born November 6, 1973) is a Canadian actor, writer, director, and editor.

Robson was born in Peterborough, Ontario and raised in Toronto. He had his writing and directorial debut with his 2015 feature film Skyquake. Robson's acting highlights include Minority Report, iZombie, War for the Planet of the Apes, Dead Rising 2 and Crazy Canucks.

Television
 Minority Report (2015)
 iZombie (2015)
 About a Girl (2007) - Dude
 Trash to Treasure (2003) - Host

Guest appearances
 Twice in a Lifetime (1999) - Handler #1
 In a Heartbeat (2000) - Guttman
 Sue Thomas: F.B.Eye (2004) - Justin
 Kevin Hill (2005) - Major Paul Cahan
 Instant Star (2006) - Ken
 Psych (2008) - Logan
 Supernatural (2011) - Redd
 Helstrom (2020) - Alex Tilden

Filmography
 The Impossible Elephant (2001) - Lenny
 Twas the Night (2001) - Harry
 Out of the Ashes (2003) - Leiku's husband
 The Cheetah Girls (2003) - Firefighter
 Crazy Canucks (2004) - Jungle Jim Hunter
 The Winning Season (2004) - Dots Miller
 Cow Belles (2006) - Thomas
 Swindle (2013) - Anton Lefarve
 Skyquake (2015)
 Dead Rising 2 (2016)
 War for the Planet of the Apes (2017)
 Once Upon a Time (2017) - Sam Ochotta (season 7; co-starring; 3 episodes)
 The Marine 5: Battleground (2017) - Vincent
 Aliens Ate My Homework (2018) - Art Allbright
 Aliens Stole My Body (2020) - Art Allbright

External links
 
 www.skyquakethemovie.com
 http://www.geekchicelite.com/filmtvreviews/movie-review-skyquake-a-psychological-success/ 

1973 births
Canadian male film actors
Canadian male stage actors
Canadian male television actors
Male actors from Ontario
Living people
People from Peterborough, Ontario